Mark Wellman is an author, filmmaker, paralympian, and motivational speaker, who is best known for his 1989 ascent of El Capitan in Yosemite National Park, which was the first ascent of the cliff by a paraplegic.  He has appeared on National television speaking about his ascent.  He has written a biography, Climbing Back, as well as given many powerful speeches for himself and other paraplegics.

Wellman lit the cauldron for the opening of the 1996 Summer Paralympics in Atlanta after carrying the flaming torch up a 120-foot rope.

Climb 
7 years before the El Capitan climb at the age of 21 Wellman lost use of his legs when he fell 100 feet off a mountain in the Sierra Nevadas, injuring his spine. However, he became the first paraplegic to climb El Capitan, over the course of six days. While he climbed up the mountain, a friend named Mike Corbett accompanied him and supported his slips.

References

External links 

Living people
Year of birth missing (living people)
People with paraplegia